The Pococke Kition inscriptions were a group of 31 Phoenician and 2 non-Phoenician inscriptions found in Cyprus and published by Richard Pococke in 1745. In describing Kition (modern Larnaca), Pococke wrote: "the walls seem to have been very strong, and in the foundations there have been found many stones, with inscriptions on them, in an unintelligible character, which I suppose, is the antient Phoenician..."

The Phoenician inscriptions are known as KAI 33 (CIS I 11), KAI 35 (CIS I 46) and CIS I 57-85. They represent some of the most important finds in Phoenician and Semitic language studies, as they were used by Jean-Jacques Barthélemy in his decipherment of the Phoenician language. 

Only one of the inscriptions still survives, in the Ashmolean Museum - all the rest were destroyed in construction work in 1749.

Surviving inscription – KAI 35

The sole surviving inscription is a marble funeral stone, numbered "2" in Pococke's sketch, measuring 12 x 3 x 3 inches; the inscription is in memory of a deceased wife. The inscription was brought to England by a Dr. Porter of Thaxted, and presented to Oxford University by Charles Gray MP in 1751. It was published many times, first by Pococke, and then by John Swinton, Richard Chandler, Jean-Jacques Barthélemy, Wilhelm Gesenius, and Johan David Åkerblad.

Today it resides at the Ashmolean Museum, with accession number AN1974.325.

Concordance

Gallery

Notes

1738 archaeological discoveries
Phoenician inscriptions
Archaeological artifacts
KAI inscriptions